Townsend Daniel Cock (December 3, 1838 – June 19, 1913) was an American farmer, banker and politician from New York.

Life
He was born and died on the family farm in Locust Valley, then in Queens County, now in Nassau County, New York. He attended the common schools, and then looked after the family farm. In 1858, he married Jane Deall Latting. Later he was President of the Oyster Bay Bank.

He was Supervisor of the Town of Oyster Bay for several terms beginning in 1867.

He was a member of the New York State Senate (1st D.) in 1872 and 1873; and of the New York State Assembly (Queens Co., 1st D.) in 1876, 1881 and 1882.

Sources
 Life Sketches of Executive Officers and Members of the Legislature of the State of New York by William H. McElroy & Alexander McBride (1873; pg. 63ff) [e-book]
 Townsend Daniel Cock in NYT on June 20, 1913

1838 births
1913 deaths
Democratic Party New York (state) state senators
People from Locust Valley, New York
Town supervisors in New York (state)
American bankers
Democratic Party members of the New York State Assembly
19th-century American politicians
19th-century American businesspeople